The 2018 United States House of Representatives elections in Virginia were held on November 6, 2018, to elect the 11 U.S. representatives from the state of Virginia, one from each of the state's 11 congressional districts. The elections coincided with other states' elections to the House of Representatives, elections to the United States Senate and various state and local elections. Primary elections took place on June 12.

The state congressional delegation flipped from a 7–4 Republican majority to a 7–4 Democratic majority. Democrats last held a majority of seats in the state in 2010.

Statewide results

By district
Results of the 2018 United States House of Representatives elections in Virginia by district:

District 1

Republican Rob Wittman had represented Virginia's 1st congressional district since 2007.  He was re-elected in 2016 with 60% of the vote. Wittman was unopposed for the Republican nomination.

Democratic primary
Vangie Williams defeated both Edwin Santana and John Suddarth in the Democratic primary with 39.97% of the vote. With her win, she became the first woman of color to ever win a primary for Congressional office throughout Virginia.

Candidates
 Edwin Santana, former Marine
 John Suddarth, army veteran and businessman
 Vangie Williams, Strategic Planner

Results

Republican primary
 Rob Wittman, incumbent U.S. Representative

General election

Endorsements

Debates
Complete video of debate, October 22, 2018

Results

District 2

Republican incumbent Scott Taylor was in a race targeted by the DCCC. This was one of only two GOP held seats that voted for Democrat Ralph Northam in 2017. The Democratic Congressional Campaign Committee supported Elaine Luria, a United States Naval Commander for the nomination.

Roanoke Commonwealth's Attorney Donald Caldwell had been appointed as a special prosecutor to investigate claims that Taylor's aides forged signatures, including those of Delegate Glenn Davis and his wife, on Shaun Brown's petitions to make the ballot as an independent candidate. Taylor had already cut ties with his campaign manager when these irregularities came to light and promised to cooperate with the investigation, and said that the irregularities in the petitions should have no bearing on Brown's right to be on the ballot.

Shaun Brown submitted 2,163 petition signatures which actually went through the verification process. 1,030 of those were considered valid. Democrats asked the Virginia State Board of Elections to remove Brown from the ballot for falling short of the 1,000 signatures required, and filed suit. They also asked Attorney General of Virginia Mark Herring to investigate.

A review of the signatures also revealed that more than 50 Virginia Beach sheriff's employees had signed petition forms at work to get Brown on the ballot during the closing days of the petition drive, when petitioners were scrambling to meet the deadline.

Brown was accused by federal prosecutors of lying to the Federal Election Commission about donating $700,000 to her campaign and bilking the government by falsifying the number of meals her nonprofit fed to needy children, but her trial—in which Brown testified in her own defense and was subjected to a lengthy cross-examination—ended in a mistrial after the jury deadlocked 11–1. In a new trial the following October, Brown was convicted of fraud conspiracy, two counts of wire fraud and theft of government property. In March, 2019 Brown was sentenced to 3 years in prison.

In September, circuit judge Gregory Rupe ordered Brown off the ballot. Brown subsequently appealed to the Virginia Supreme Court but justices declined to hear her case. The Virginia Attorney General's office argued that it was too late for her to appear on the ballot.

Democratic primary

Candidates
 Elaine Luria, United States Naval Commander
 Karen Mallard, teacher

Results

Republican primary
Taylor was challenged in the Republican primary by former James City County Supervisor Mary Jones, who attacked Rep. Taylor for his moderate stances and because she believed he hadn't backed President Donald Trump's proposals strongly enough.

Candidates

 Mary Jones, James City County Supervisor 
 Scott Taylor, incumbent

Results

General election

Endorsements

Polling

Results

District 3

Democratic incumbent Bobby Scott ran unopposed, as no Republican candidates filed for the district.

Democratic primary
 Bobby Scott, incumbent

General election

Results

District 4

After the 4th district was redrawn by the courts for the 2016 elections, Democratic incumbent Donald McEachin was elected and ran unopposed for the Democratic nomination.

Democratic primary
Donald McEachin, incumbent

Republican primary

Candidates
 Ryan McAdams, pastor
 Shion Fenty, fashion designer

Results

General election

Endorsements

Results

District 5

Incumbent Tom Garrett, first elected in 2016, announced on May 28, 2018, that he would not run for reelection due to his struggle with alcoholism. Instead of a traditional primary to elect the Democratic and Republican nominees, party delegates voted to hold district conventions instead.

Democratic convention
The Democratic convention was held on May 5, 2018. The party delegates chose Leslie Cockburn as the Democratic nominee.

Candidates
 Leslie Cockburn, investigative journalist
 Roger Dean "RD" Huffstetler, Marine veteran
 Andrew Sneathern, former Albemarle County assistant attorney

Republican convention
The Republican convention was held on June 2, 2018, less than one week after incumbent Tom Garrett Jr. announced he would not seek reelection. Denver Riggleman edged out Cynthia Dunbar, who had just lost the Republican nomination in the  6th district just weeks before, in the final round of voting to get the Republican nomination.

Candidates
Denver Riggleman, distillery owner
 Cynthia Dunbar, national GOP committeewoman
 Joe Whited, veteran
 Michael Del Rosso, technology executive
 Martha Boneta, farmer
 Michael Webert, state delegate

General election

Debates
Complete video of debate, October 8, 2018

Endorsements

Polling

Results

District 6

The 6th district was an open seat in 2018, after the Republican incumbent, Bob Goodlatte, representative from the 6th district since 1993, announced his retirement in November 2017.

Democratic primary

Candidates 

 Sergio Coppola
 Jennifer Lewis, hospital liaison
 Charlotte Moore, former Roanoke County supervisor
 Peter Volosin, regional planner

Results

Republican convention
Republican delegates decided to hold a party convention instead of the primary to choose their nominee. Eight Republicans ran in the convention in this district, where State Delegate Ben Cline was chosen as the GOP nominee.

Candidates 
 Ben Cline, state delegate
 Mike Desjadon
 Cynthia Dunbar, RNC Committeewoman
 Chaz Haywood, Rockingham County Clerk of Court
 Ed Justo, lawyer
 Kathryn Lewis, small business owner
 Elliot Pope, businessman
 Douglas Wright, dentist and U.S. Navy veteran

General election

Results

District 7

After Dave Brat upset the former House Majority leader, Eric Cantor, in 2014, Brat won reelection in 2016 with 57% of the vote. Helen Alli originally was going to run as a Democrat but failed to turn in enough signatures; she then was nominated by the Whigs but again failed to turn in enough signatures; finally running as a write-in candidate.

Democratic primary

Candidates
 Abigail Spanberger, former CIA operations officer
 Dan Ward, former U.S. Marine Corps EA-6B Prowler pilot
 Joseph B. Walton

Results

Republican primary
David Brat, incumbent

General election

Debates
Complete video of debate, October 15, 2018

Polling

Results

District 8

In the 8th district, Democrat Don Beyer had served since the 2014 election. Beyer won reelection in 2016 with 68% of the vote.

Democratic primary
Don Beyer, incumbent

Republican primary
Thomas Oh, federal contractor

General election

Results

District 9

In the 9th district, Republican Morgan Griffith had two Democratic opponents, Anthony Flaccavento and Justin Santopietro, and a Whig opponent, Scott Blankenship, in this strongly Republican district.

Democratic primary

Candidates 

 Anthony Flaccavento, farmer
 Justin Santopietro

Results

Republican primary
Morgan Griffith, incumbent

General election

Polling

Results

District 10

In the 10th district, six Democratic candidates, encouraged by the fact that Republican incumbent Barbara Comstock's district voted for Hillary Clinton in the 2016 U.S. Presidential Election, submitted the required number of signatures to run for that seat. Republicans believed, however, that given that Comstock was an excellent fundraiser and fierce campaigner, she would be able to keep the seat. April polling was favorable to a generic Democrat against Comstock, although Comstock performed much better in polling when her name was on the ballot against a named Democratic opponent.

Patriarchist libertarian Nathan Larson filed to run as an independent, but then withdrew his candidacy on August 13 and endorsed Wexton, calling her "the accelerationist choice"; Wexton, through a spokesman, declined the endorsement. Comstock tweeted, "It is good news for all voters in the 10th District that Nathan Larson, a convicted felon who served time in prison for threatening to kill the President and is an admitted pedophile, an admitted rapist, white supremacist, and misogynist, is now off the ballot in the 10th Congressional District."

Democratic primary

Candidates
 Jennifer Wexton, state senator
 Lindsey Davis Stover, senior advisor to Barack Obama's Veterans Affairs Secretary Eric K. Shinseki
 Daniel Helmer, army veteran
 Alison Friedman, former State Department official
 Julia Biggins, scientist
 Paul Pelletier, federal prosecutor

Results

Republican primary

Candidates
 Barbara Comstock, incumbent congresswoman
 Shak Hill, combat pilot

Results

General election

Debates
Complete video of debate, September 21, 2018

Polling

Results

District 11

In the 11th district, Democratic incumbent Gerry Connolly, who ran unopposed in 2016, faced no primary challengers. However, he faced Republican U.S. Army veteran Jeff Dove in the general election. Also running was Libertarian Stevan Porter.

Democratic primary
Gerry Connolly, incumbent

Republican primary
Jeff Dove, veteran

General election

Results

See also 
 2018 Virginia elections

References

External links
Candidates at Vote Smart
Candidates at Ballotpedia
Campaign finance at FEC
Campaign finance at OpenSecrets

Official campaign websites for first district candidates
Vangie Williams (D) for Congress
Rob Wittman (R) for Congress

Official campaign websites for second district candidates
Scott Taylor (R) for Congress
Elaine Luria (D) for Congress

Official campaign websites for third district candidates
Bobby Scott (D) for Congress

Official campaign websites for fourth district candidates
Ryan McAdams (R) for Congress
A. Donald McEachin (D) for Congress
Pete Wells (L) for Congress

Official campaign websites for fifth district candidates
Leslie Cockburn (D) for Congress
Denver Riggleman (R) for Congress

Official campaign websites for sixth district candidates
Ben Cline (R) for Congress
Jennifer Lewis (D) for Congress

Official campaign websites for seventh district candidates
Dave Brat (R) for Congress
Abigail Spanberger (D) for Congress
Joe Walton (L) for Congress

Official campaign websites for eighth district candidates
Don Beyer (D) for Congress
Thomas Oh (R) for Congress

Official campaign websites of ninth district candidates
Anthony Flaccavento (D) for Congress
Morgan Griffith (R) for Congress

Official campaign websites for tenth district candidates
Barbara Comstock (R) for Congress
Jennifer Wexton (D) for Congress

Official campaign websites for eleventh district candidates
Gerry Connolly (D) for Congress
Jeff Dove (R) for Congress
Stevan Porter (L) for Congress

2018
Virginia
United States House of Representatives